Lee Tsuen Seng (born 26 April 1979) is a former badminton player from Malaysia. He was part of the Malaysian team that won silver in the 2002 Thomas & Uber Cup. He also won a silver medal in men's singles at the 2002 Commonwealth Games.

Achievements

Commonwealth Games 
Men's singles

BWF Grand Prix 
The BWF Grand Prix has two levels, the BWF Grand Prix and Grand Prix Gold. It is a series of badminton tournaments sanctioned by the Badminton World Federation (BWF) since 2007. The World Badminton Grand Prix sanctioned by International Badminton Federation (IBF) from 1983 to 2006.

Men's singles

  BWF Grand Prix Gold tournament
  BWF & IBF Grand Prix tournament

References

1979 births
Living people
People from Ipoh
Malaysian sportspeople of Chinese descent
Malaysian male badminton players
Asian Games medalists in badminton
Badminton players at the 2002 Asian Games
People from Perak
Asian Games bronze medalists for Malaysia
Commonwealth Games silver medallists for Malaysia
Badminton players at the 2002 Commonwealth Games
Commonwealth Games medallists in badminton
Medalists at the 2002 Asian Games
Medallists at the 2002 Commonwealth Games